La bella di Lodi is a 1963 Italian comedy film directed by Mario Missiroli. It is based on the novel with the same name written by Alberto Arbasino.

In 2008 it was restored and shown as part of the retrospective "Questi fantasmi: Cinema italiano ritrovato" at the 65th Venice International Film Festival.

Cast 
Stefania Sandrelli as Roberta
Ángel Aranda as Franco Garbagnati
Elena Borgo as grandmother of Roberta
Maria Monti as Annamaria

References

External links

1963 films
Italian comedy films
Commedia all'italiana
Films scored by Piero Umiliani
1963 comedy films
1963 directorial debut films
1960s Italian films